Eagle News ( Iigliin medee), formerly known as Eagle TV ( Iigl Televiz) is a television broadcaster in Mongolia. The station focuses on independent news, uncensored live audience feedback, and, formerly, Protestant Christian programming.

History 
From 1994 to 2002 Eagle Television was operated on terrestrial Channel 8 by Mongolian Broadcasting Company (MBC). MBC was a joint venture of the American nonprofit, AMONG Foundation, and Mongolia Media Corporation (MMC). Incumbent Mongolian President Tsakhiagiin Elbegdorj-then well known Mongolian democracy leader and a Member of Parliament helped to create Mongolia's first independent TV station Eagle Television in 1994. In 2002, the American Tom Terry took over the management of MBC and Eagle TV.

Terry moved to transform the TV station's struggling news and Christian programming in keeping with his vision of political freedom and the advocacy of Christianity. This proved to be a magnet of controversy as the station was opened to uncensored live commentary from viewers and launched the nation's first live international news coverage. Uncensored public commentary was a radical change in Mongolia's media and political landscape. Newspaper articles and criticism from public officials on Mongolia's State run television were countered by Eagle TV openly advocating increased freedom of speech and press through television, and it launched a strategy to increase public input into Eagle TV's on-air operations.

In the early years, notable programming that aired on the channel included NBA playoffs with Mongolian commentary, The Flintstones (dubbed and renamed as The Flintstone People) and CNN relays. This was attached to religious programming, both local and American. In 1997, it was expected that the Christian programming would be dropped by 2000.

At the same time, unbeknown to Eagle TV's viewers, the shareholders were embroiled in long-standing and severe disagreements over issues of contribution and control of the newly dynamic TV station. One month after achieving its highest-ever ratings, the shareholders abruptly closed the station as a result of legal threats and corporate infighting. The government of Mongolia, controlled by the former communist party, reacted by revoking MBC's broadcast license, preventing the station from re-launching its operations.

After the station's closure, AMONG Foundation formed Eagle Broadcasting Company, appointing Tom Terry as managing director, and charging him with re-launching Eagle TV as a cable TV channel. About half a year later the new Eagle TV began broadcasting on SANSAR Cable as Mongolia's first all-news cable channel.

Eagle TV launched a 24/7 news format with uncensored public commentary during live newscasts as a cornerstone of the station. In addition, it launched the nation's first live coverage of in-country breaking news including the only all-day live coverage of Mongolia's 2005 presidential election.

In light of the increasing popularity of Eagle TV's cable operations, the former business partners AMONG and MMC negotiated their further cooperation over most of 2005. The talks resulted in an agreement in September 2005 for the Mongolian side to acquire the broadcast license for terrestrial Channel 8, and Eagle Broadcasting Company to have exclusive use of the channel for ten years, and exercising exclusive control over all television content during that period. Based upon the agreement the Mongolian government restored the license for Channel 8, paving the way for Eagle TV to return to its former channel.

On October 22, 2005, Eagle Television launched its Channel 8 broadcasts with live all-day coverage of U.S. Secretary of Defense Donald Rumsfeld’s visit to Mongolia.

On April 1, 2011 Eagle TV was sold to Mongolia Media Corporation, a subsidiary of Bodi International. Terry resigned his position as company president and was appointed as Executive Director of AMONG Mongolia, a television production company in Ulaanbaatar producing Christian television programming airing on Eagle TV.

On February 3rd, 2014 Terry released, "Like An Eagle," a biography of his nine years with Eagle Television. At this point, the station had become a full-on news channel (Eagle News) owned by Mongol Mass Media Group, also becoming a CNN partner. The channel had become entirely secular, having dropped their religious programming from the days as a station owned by the AMONG Foundation. The religious programming moved to sister channel Eagle Live, with AMONG only being involved in program production rather than channel ownership.

See also
Media of Mongolia
Communications in Mongolia

References

External links
Official Site 
AMONG Foundation U.S.-based former owner of Eagle Television in Mongolia.

Television companies of Mongolia
Television channels and stations established in 1994
1994 establishments in Mongolia